South Kembangan is an administrative village in the Kembangan district, city of West Jakarta, Indonesia. It has postal code of 11610.

See also 

 Kembangan

References 

West Jakarta
Administrative villages in Jakarta